The Continental IO-370 engine is a family of fuel injected four-cylinder, horizontally opposed, air-cooled aircraft engines that were developed for use in light aircraft by Continental Aerospace Technologies. There is no carbureted version of this engine, which would have been designation O-370, therefore the base model is the IO-370.

Variants 
IO-370-CL
Dynafocal engine mount version.  at 2700 rpm, dry weight . Certified 11 October 2018.
IO-370-CM
Conical engine mount version.  at 2700 rpm, dry weight . Certified 11 October 2018.
IO-370-DA3A
Dynafocal engine mount version.  at 2700 rpm, dry weight . Not certified.

Specifications (IO-370-DA3A)

References

External links
Official website

IO-360